Jared Talor Lakind (born March 9, 1992) is an American-Israeli professional baseball pitcher who is a free agent. He also plays for Team Israel.

In high school, Lakind played first base, outfield, and pitcher, and in his senior year in 2010 was named the Texas District 15-5A Most Valuable Player, Sun Player of the Year, and a Rawlings-Perfect Game 1st Team All-American. Drafted by the Pittsburgh Pirates in the 23rd round of the 2010 Major League Baseball draft, he signed for $400,000—far above the maximum of $150,000 that Major League Baseball recommended for all players drafted after the 5th round.

In 2013 Lakind was converted to a relief pitcher, and in 2015 he pitched for both the GCL Pirates and the West Virginia Power, and was a combined 3–1 with a 1.69 ERA in 20 games. In 2016, he pitched for the Altoona Curve of the Class AA Eastern League, set a team record for consecutive scoreless innings pitched in a single season at 25.1, and was named to the Eastern League All Star Team. For the season, he was 5–1 with 7 saves, and had a 2.59 ERA in 47 games. Lakind pitched for Team Israel at the 2017 World Baseball Classic qualifier in September 2016, and joined and pitched for the team in the second round of the WBC in Japan in March 2017.

Early life
Lakind was born in Cypress, Texas, and is Jewish.  His father, grandfather, and uncle are Israeli citizens. His father, Larry Lakind, played baseball and football at Montclair State in New Jersey, and his grandfather, Alvin Lakind, played professional baseball in 1953 for the Amarillo Gold Sox in the West Texas-New Mexico League. His older sister, Harriet, played high school and college basketball. He began playing t-ball at 4 years of age.

High school
Lakind played first base, outfield, and pitcher while at Cypress Woods High School. In 2009, as a junior he was named a Perfect Game Underclass 1st Team All American, was a member of the 2009 Texas Rangers Area Code Team, and was a member of the 2009 Aflac All American Team.  Lakind pitched in the Aflac All-American High School Baseball Classic.

In 2010, as a senior he hit .404/.523/.764, with 5 home runs and 23 RBIs. On the mound he had an 8–0 record, a 1.88 ERA, and 91 strikeouts in 63.1 innings pitched, and pitched the first no-hitter in school history. At the time he threw both a 4-seam and 2-seam fastball that touched 90–91 mph, a curveball with a late break (77–79 mph), and a change-up (81–83 mph).

He was named the District 15-5A Most Valuable Player, and Sun Player of the Year. He was also named a 2010 Rawlings-Perfect Game 1st Team All-American, Texas – All-Region 1st Team, and Rivals.com named him the # 60 high school baseball prospect in the nation (writing "With ability to either stay at first base or develop into a pitcher, Lakind has drawn comparisons all over the map. Most frequently he has been discussed as a 20-home run-type first baseman.").

Career

Pittsburgh Pirates
Lakind, who had a letter of intent to play for the University of Arkansas, was drafted by the Pirates as a first baseman in the 23rd round of the 2010 Major League Baseball draft, and signed in August 2010 for a signing bonus of $400,000—far above the maximum of $150,000 that Major League Baseball recommended for all players drafted after the 5th round. He began his professional career in 2010 and 2011 as a first baseman with the GCL Pirates of the Rookie Gulf Coast League. In 2012, he played first base for the State College Spikes of the Class A- New York-Penn League.

In 2013 Lakind was converted to a relief pitcher and pitched in 17 games for the Jamestown Jammers of the New York-Penn League. In 2014, he pitched for both Jamestown and for the West Virginia Power of the Class A South Atlantic League, and for the two teams combined was 0–1 with a 3.57 ERA in 25 games.

In 2015, he pitched for both the GCL Pirates and the West Virginia Power, and was a combined 3–1 with a 1.69 ERA in 20 games. He missed half the season, due to surgery to remove a cyst from the sciatic nerve in his left leg.  That year his fastball was noted as having good deception, which made it look faster to batters.

In 2016, the Pirates skipped him over Class A+ Bradenton and had Lakind pitch for the Altoona Curve of the Class AA Eastern League.  He set a team record for consecutive scoreless frames pitched in a single season at 25.1 innings from May 5 – June 23. Lakind was named to the Eastern League All Star Team as a member of the bullpen.  For the season, he was 5–1 with 7 saves and had a 2.59 ERA in 47 games and a career-high 66 innings, and had 8.5 K/9.  He throws a fastball that reaches 94 mph, and has a good breaking ball.

In October 2016 the Pirates re-signed Lakind, which kept him from becoming a minor league free agent.

He started the 2017 season pitching for Altoona, for whom he was 1–1 with 2 saves and a 6.81 ERA, and 38 strikeouts in 35.2 innings. On July 7, the Pirates released him from the organization.

Miami Marlins
One week later he signed with the Miami Marlins who assigned him to the Greensboro Grasshoppers of the Class A South Atlantic League, for whom he was 1–1 with a 4.24 ERA, and then to the Jupiter Hammerheads of the Class A+  Florida State League, for whom he pitched 1.2 scoreless innings. He elected to be a free agent on November 6.

Lancaster Barnstormers
In 2018, Lakind pitched for the Lancaster Barnstormers of the independent Atlantic League of Professional Baseball. He was 2–3 with a 3.83 ERA, in 42.1 innings over 41 games. He became a free agent following the 2018 season. In the 2018–19 winter season, he pitched for Charros de Jalisco of the Mexican Pacific Winter League.

In 2019, Lakind re-signed with the Lancaster Barnstormers. Pitching for the team in 2019 he was 7–9	with a 4.82 ERA, and was 10th in the league with 98 strikeouts in 142.0 innings. He became a free agent following the season. Lakind re-signed with the Barnstormers on February 22, 2020. However, he did not play with the team in 2020 as the season was canceled due to the COVID-19 pandemic.

Team Texas
In July 2020, Lakind signed on to play for Team Texas of the Constellation Energy League (a makeshift 4-team independent league created as a result of the pandemic) for the 2020 season.

Lancaster Barnstormers (second stint)
On February 26, 2021, Lakind re-signed with the Lancaster Barnstormers of the Atlantic League of Professional Baseball. He became a free agent following the season.

Team Israel
Lakind pitched for Team Israel at the 2017 World Baseball Classic qualifier in September 2016.  To demonstrate to Team Israel that he was Jewish, Lakind's family sent the team a photo of the tombstone of Lakind's grandmother, with a Star of David carved onto it. Lakind's only appearance in the tournament was during the second game, against Brazil. He threw 31 pitches over 1 inning, walking 2 and striking out 2, and picking up the hold.

Lakind pitched for Team Israel in the second round of the 2017 World Baseball Classic. He pitched in 2 games, pitching 1.2 scoreless innings.

In November 2019, he obtained Israeli citizenship so that he could play for Team Israel in baseball at the 2020 Summer Olympics in Tokyo.
Lakind was included on the roster for Team Israel at the 2020 Olympics, but was later replaced after suffering an injury while playing for the Lancaster Barnstormers.

References

External links

Twitter

1992 births
Living people
Israeli American
Israeli baseball players
Altoona Curve players
Baseball players from Texas
Greensboro Grasshoppers players
Gulf Coast Pirates players
Jamestown Jammers players
Jewish American baseball players
People from Cypress, Texas
State College Spikes players
West Virginia Power players
Jupiter Hammerheads players
Lancaster Barnstormers players
Charros de Jalisco players
2017 World Baseball Classic players
Team Texas players
21st-century American Jews